LTC TV Channel is an Egyptian TV channel based in Giza, Egypt. It covers current events, as well as broadcasting content concerning political and religious topics, and some entertainment programmes. The channel has a particular focus on Egyptian topics. Its main owner Samira El deghedy.

References

External links

Television stations in Egypt
Arabic-language television stations